William Riddell (1807–1847) was a Roman Catholic bishop. 

William Riddell may also refer to:

James Riddell (skier) (born William James Riddell; 1909–2000), British skier and author
W. G. Riddell (1865–1957), New Zealand magistrate
W. J. B. Riddell (1899–1976), Scottish ophthalmologist
William Renwick Riddell (1852–1945), Canadian lawyer, judge, and historian

See also
William Riedell (1904–1952), American naval officer, engineer, and sports shooter
William Biddell (1825–1900), British politician